Long Branch is a GO Transit railway station in Toronto, Ontario, Canada. It is one of the Lakeshore West line stations, serving the Long Branch neighbourhood.

Being one of the original GO Stations built in 1967, it is now scheduled for modernization. The plans would make the station accessible with new elevators, connecting tunnels, washrooms and canopies over the platforms. It is expected to be 2016 before these upgrades are complete. It is also anticipated that more condominium development in the area will increase the population density of the neighbourhood and attract more riders.

Connecting local transit

The station is adjacent to the Toronto Transit Commission's Long Branch Loop, which serves as the western terminus of the 501 Queen streetcar route as well as TTC and MiWay bus routes.

References

External links

GO Transit railway stations
Railway stations in Toronto
Transport in Etobicoke
Railway stations in Canada opened in 1967
1967 establishments in Ontario